Prayudh Payutto (also P.A. Payutto; , ป.อ. ปยุตฺโต) (b. 1937), also known by his current monastic title, Somdet Phra Buddhakosajarn, is a well-known Thai Buddhist monk, an intellectual, and a prolific writer.

Prayudh has lectured and written extensively about a variety of topics related to Buddhism, including the position of women in Buddhism and the relationship between Buddhism and the environment. He was awarded the 1994 UNESCO Prize for Peace Education.

Because changes in Thai monastic title involve adding or changing monastic names, Payutto has been known by, and published under, a variety of different names over his career. Previously, he was known as Phra Rajavaramuni, Phra Debvedhi, Phra Dhammapitaka, and Phra Bhramagunabhorn. Upon his appointment to the Sangha Supreme Council in 2016, his current title is Somdet Phra Buddhakosajarn.

Early life
Prayudh was born as the fifth child of Samran and Chunkee Arayangkoon on January 12, 1938 in Si Prachan District, Suphanburi Province, Thailand.
Prayudh received his early education in Suphanburi. During his childhood, Prayudh suffered a lot of illnesses, some of which involved him in surgeries and many have followed him until today. Poor health made it difficult for him to commit to school and formal education. Discouraged by his health, Prayudh came back to Suphanburi after completing junior high school at Pathum Khongkha School in Bangkok in 1950. Being assured that he could continue his education without having to get involved physically, as is the case in school, he entered the monastery, with the family's support, to seek religious education, being ordained as a novice (samanera) at the age of 13. He began the study of Pali and received training in Vipassanā. Under his father's encouragement, he moved to Wat Phra Piren in Bangkok and went on to achieve the highest-level (ninth-level) studies in the Pali language while still a samanera, for which he was granted a royal ordination ceremony into monkhood in 1962. He embraced the monastic name "Payutto", literally "a person with unrelenting efforts". Prayudh received a bachelor's degree in Buddhist studies from Mahachulalongkornrajavidyalaya University in 1962.

A scholarly monk
After securing instructor qualifications, Prayudh was appointed Associate Dean of Mahachulalongkornrajavidyalaya University and had maintained this position for the following ten years. He played an important role in modernizing Sangha's education by relating knowledge in Buddhism to contemporary social issues. Prayudh assumed the post of Deputy Abbot of Wat Phra Piren in 1973, but resigned three years later to dedicate himself to academic work. He published a number of books and articles, and regularly attended academic seminars and conferences, surrounding himself with contemporary scholars and intellectuals. He authored Buddhadhamma, recognized as a masterpiece among Buddhist scholars. He received honorary degrees from more than ten universities, both domestic and foreign. When he received UNESCO's Prize for Peace Education, he  to the Ministry of Education of Thailand for the establishing of Phra Dhampitaka Education for Peace Foundation.

Prayudh is currently serving as Abbot of Nyanavesakavan Temple (Wat Nyanavesakavan), located in Tambon Bang Krathuek, Amphoe Sam Phran, Nakhon Pathom Province.

Defending the Pali Canon
Prayudh strongly believes in strict interpretation of Pali Canon, very much in line with the Theravada tradition. He went public in many occasions in defense of the Pali Canon whenever its integrity was challenged. For example, in the mid-1990s, Prayudh published a book called The Case of Dhammakaya, in which he discussed the controversy related to the concepts dhammakaya and Nibbana as interpreted by the Dhammakaya Movement. Prayudh reviewed the essence of the Pali Canon, cited Pali texts  he believed were misinterpreted by the temple, and came up with counterarguments in the context of the Pali Canon. He argued that the term Dhammakaya was not correctly interpreted, and claimed that if the temple continued  to uphold false interpretations, it could not do so any longer under the umbrella of Theravada Buddhism.

Wat Phra Dhammakaya replied in several ways. One assistant-abbot of the temple, Luang phi Thanavuddho, wrote an essay in which he defended the temple's views. He compared discussing the nature of Nirvana with the well-known metaphor of blind people feeling an elephant and getting in a fight about what it is they are feeling. This metaphor is also mentioned in the Pali Canon. He also referred to interpretations of Pali scholars C.A.F. Rhys Davids and I.B. Horner, but Prayudh dismissed these as incorrect.

Achievements 
Prayudh has published a number of books that examine contemporary social issues, such as abortion, from a viewpoint of Buddhism. He regularly expresses Buddhist viewpoints on areas as diverse as education, law, social sciences and natural sciences. Prayudh stresses the Buddhist approach of middle path as the inevitable way to achieve peace and sustainable development. He argues that Buddhism is the eventual aggregation of natural laws and that it forms a basis of modern sciences. Prayudh also points to Buddhism as the indispensable path to happiness.

International awards and recognitions
 1994 UNESCO Prize for Peace Education
 1995 Appointed to a post of Tipitaka Acharaya, as a scholar well versed in the Pali Canon, by Nava Nalanda Institute
 2005 Awarded the Most Eminent Scholar as a guru of Theravada Buddhism by The World Buddhist University

References

Further reading 
 Olson, Grant Allan (1989). A Person-Centered Ethnography of Thai Buddhism: The Life of Phra Rajavaramuni ( Prayudh Payutto), Ithaca, NY: Cornell University
 Seeger, Martin (2005). Phra Dhammapitaka und die Pali-Kanon-Debatte in Thailand: Ein Beitrag zur Untersuchung des modernen Buddhismus. PhD thesis, Hamburg: Universität Hamburg

External links
 Selected Books of Ven. P.A. Payutto
 Selected Audio-Files / Audio-Teachings of Ven. P.A. Payutto
 Buddhadhamma
 A Constitution for Living: Buddhist Principles for a Fruitful and Harmonious Life (BP620S)

1938 births
Living people
Prayudh Payutto
Prayudh Payutto